Areius was a cultic epithet of the Greek god Zeus, which may mean either "the warlike god" (in the sense of "like Ares") or "the propitiating and atoning god" (as Areia in the case of Athena).

In the myth of Oenomaus, this mythological king sacrificed to Zeus Areius whenever he entered upon a contest with the suitors of his daughter, whom he put to death as soon as they had been beaten.

In reality, ancient Greek kings of the Molossians would sacrifice to Areius at the city of Passaron, and exchange oaths with the people over which they ruled: the king swore to uphold the laws, and the people swore to defend the kingdom from threats. If the king failed to live up to this oath, the people would be relieved of their obligations here, and so throughout history we would sometimes see kings removed for this failure.

There exists an inscription on a column in Galilee which indicates the column was a gift from persons unknown to the priests of Zeus Areius, which would seem to indicate a significant priesthood in this city at least.

Notes

Epithets of Zeus
Greek war deities